Pardeep Singh  is an Indian weightlifter from Jalandhar, Punjab who won Silver medal in the men's 105 kg weight class at the 2018 Commonwealth Games.

References

External links

Living people
1995 births
Indian male weightlifters
Commonwealth Games medallists in weightlifting
Weightlifters at the 2018 Commonwealth Games
Commonwealth Games silver medallists for India
People from Jalandhar
Medallists at the 2018 Commonwealth Games